Ivanna Anatoliyivna Sakhno (born 14 November 1997) is a Ukrainian and American actress. She is known for her roles as Cadet Viktoriya in the science fiction monster film Pacific Rim Uprising (2018) and the hitwoman, "Nadejda", in the 2018 action comedy film The Spy Who Dumped Me. She had already achieved certain prominence in Ukraine after appearing in 2005 in the first ever Ukrainian-language sitcom, Lesia + Roma, and the 2013 biopic Ivan the Powerful.

Life and career
Ivanna Sakhno was born in Kyiv, Ukraine, in a family of local filmmakers. Ivanna has a brother named Taras (Tar), an inventor of a scientific field "Conceptology" and a digital arts producer.

Her dream of acting started when in 2004 she watched the film Amélie.

At the age of 13, Ivanna Sakhno left Ukraine to study English in Vancouver. It was here she was discovered by Janet Hirshenson and Jane Jenkins at a casting workshop, later, in 2018 she came to the attention of Katelyn Feuling.

Sakhno moved to the United States in 2013, settling in Hollywood to pursue an acting career. While there she studied at Beverly Hills High School and later at the Lee Strasberg Theatre and Film Institute, working with Ivana Chubbuck. 
Sakhno's first television appearance was in the 2005 series Lesya + Roma (a Ukrainian adaptation of the successful Canadian sitcom Un gars, une fille) and her debut feature film role was as "Milka" in the 2013 biopic film, Ivan the Powerful. Her first major Hollywood role was in Thomas Dunn's 2016 thriller film The Body Tree. She followed this with roles in two big budget 2018 releases, Pacific Rim Uprising and The Spy Who Dumped Me.

At the 2015 Cannes Film Festival, Sakhno expressed her support for Ukrainian political prisoners held by the Russian Federation authorities.

Filmography

Feature films

Television

References

External links
 

1997 births
Living people
Actors from Kyiv
21st-century Ukrainian actresses
Ukrainian child actresses
Ukrainian film actresses
Ukrainian television actresses
Ukrainian expatriates in the United States